Chak No. 147/148 NB is a village in Sillanwali of District Sargodha, Punjab, Pakistan. It is situated 42 km away from Sargodha City  and 9 km from its Tehsil Sillanwali at Lakhowana Road. It is also known as Lakhowana (Punjabi and ).

Overview 
It is a Union Council No. 121 of the neighboring villages. It is surrounded by a canal, Rajbah Naurang. The primary source of income in this village is agriculture but most of the people of the village have jobs in Public as well as in Private Sector.

History 
This village came to existence in early 19th century. Before then, all of the area from Shahnikdar to Shaheenabad consists of bushes and other plants. It looked like pasture so people living in Sargodha and its neighboring villages went there to graze animals and they returned after weeks. Ancestors told that the place where the village is situated was a plain ground among those bushes and irregular topography of the land so this place was suitable to live so at night, they encamped there. But they had to face a big trouble there was no source of fresh water so they used to bring water with them but later on, they found a low-lying area on the south west of the today's village that had the capability of collecting rainwater so they brought their animals to this pond to drink water and initially they built temporary mud buildings to protect animals and themselves from harsh weather conditions like storms, rains and sun etc. Afterward some people permanently settled at that place and it is said that a person named Lakho lived here and name of the village Lakhowana made from his name. In this way the village came to existence and after the partition of British India, this village was properly registered.

Union Council 

This village is the headquarters of Union Council 121, which consists on the following villages.

 Chak No. 147/148 NB
 Chak No. 143 NB
 Chak No. 146 NB
 Chak No. 149/150 NB

Facilities 
Government of Punjab provided medical and educational facilities to this village

Medical Facilities 
The Basic Health Unit ) is provided to village by the government. It provides all Primary Health Center (PHC) services along with integral services that include basic medical and surgical care, CDD, CDC, ARI, Malaria and TB control.

Educational Facilities 
Government of Punjab has provided High School for Boys and Elementary School for Girls.

Government Boys High School
Government Girls Elementary School

Notable Persons 
 Atta Muhammad Sialvi was the former Imam of Jamia Masjid of the village.
 Colonel Saleh Muhammad was the former headman (Numbardar) of the village.

References 

Populated places in Sargodha District
Villages in Pakistan
Villages in Punjab, Pakistan
Villages in Sargodha District
Villages in Sillanwali Tehsil
Union councils of Sargodha District